Kotochalia is a genus of moths belonging to the family Psychidae.

The species of this genus are found in Africa.

Species:

Kotochalia doubledaii 
Kotochalia junodi 
Kotochalia shirakii

References

Psychidae
Psychidae genera